Mar's Wark is a ruined building in Stirling built 1570–1572 by John Erskine, Regent of Scotland and Earl of Mar, and now in the care of Historic Scotland. Mar intended the building for the principal residence of the Erskine family in Stirling, whose chief had become hereditary keeper of the nearby royal Stirling Castle where the princes of Scotland were schooled. The house was known as "Mar's Lodging."

Wark is a Scots language word for work, and here it stands for Workhouse. Stirling Town Council took control of the building in 1733, and converted it into a Workhouse (hence "Mar's Wark"). So it remained until the 1745 Jacobite rising, when it was occupied by Jacobite troops and was then badly damaged by cannon fire from the government garrison in the castle. The Town Council abandoned the building and relocated the Workhouse elsewhere in the town (now city).  However, the site continued to be known as Mar's Wark, or sometimes Mar's Work until the present day.

Description
The building fronts the kirk yard of the Holy Rude Church and sits at the head of the processional route to Stirling Castle above the town's tollbooth. The windowless front façade survives lacking its upper storey, access is possible to the first floor. The basement vaults have doors and windows to the street and may have been intended for shops.

The façade is nearly symmetrical around a gatehouse frontispiece with two polygonal towers. Liberal carved stone decoration is based on European print-sources or decorative arts with royal and Erskine heraldry, and wry inscriptions. A motif of the letter "A" with the earl's coronet points to a variant version of the family name, as "Areskine," or possibly the initial of Mar's countess, Annabella Murray. Traditionally it has been alleged that the carvings include stones re-cycled from Cambuskenneth Abbey.

The general articulation and architectural mouldings closely reflect royal buildings, especially the palace at Stirling Castle. The Earl of Mar may well have called upon the skills of the royal Master of Work to the Crown of Scotland of the time, William MacDowall.

The Wark is now protected by the Scottish Government as a scheduled monument.

Inscriptions
The middle Scots inscriptions carved on the gatehouse centrepiece refer to the onlooker's appreciation of the architecture and the eminence of the Regent himself in the building's own voice:

South tower I pray all luikaris on this lugingWith gentile E to gif thair jugingI pray all lookers on this lodging,With gentle eye to give their judging.North towerThe moir I stand on oppin hithtMy faultis moir subject ar to sithtThe more I stand on open height,My faults more subject are to sight.(As I am so prominent, so my faults are more obvious)Internal (exit) archEsspy speik furth and spair nochtConsidder veil I cair nothtSee, speak forth and spare not (or possibly; question not),Consider well, I care not.

History
It is often said that the building was never finished, but there is little evidence for this, although it was probably unfinished at the death of Regent Mar in October 1572. It seems from the records of Stirling burgh that his widow Countess Annabella continued to use the building. In April 1584 supporters of the Earl of Angus were ordered to surrender the castle and the town gates of Stirling with the "lodging of Annabell, Countess of Mar, and other places of fortification." The captive Earl of Gowrie was brought to the "Lady Marrs House" for his trial in May 1584.

In December 1593 Anne of Denmark, pregnant with Prince Henry came to Stirling and was first lodged in the Earl of Argyll's house, then Lady Mar's lodging until her rooms in castle were ready. In May 1595 a banquet for the marriage of the king's mistress Anne Murray and Lord Glamis was to be held at the Countess of Mar's new house in Stirling. In 1602 a French ambassador, the Baron de Tour came to Stirling and had a talk with the Countess in "Lady Mar's House".

As the lodging commands Broad Street and the town it was later used to mount artillery during civil unrest. The building seems to be mentioned in this context in May 1578, when there was a discussion about holding a parliament in the tolbooth, and copies of documents refer to "Lady Maries House", possibly meaning "Lady Mar's House".

References

Further reading
 Chris Tabraham, Argyll's Lodging & Mar's Wark Historic Scotland (2002). .
 Fleming, J. S., 'Regent Mar's Ludging,' in PSAS, (January 1905), pp.153-172 line drawings of sculpture and details of inscriptions.

External links
 
 Historic Environment Scotland: Visitor guide
 Mar's Wark, Scotland's Places

Houses completed in 1572
Scheduled monuments in Scotland
Historic Environment Scotland properties
Ruins in Stirling (council area)
16th century in Scotland
Renaissance architecture in Scotland
1572 establishments in Scotland